Lanark Loch is a man-made loch in the town of Lanark, South Lanarkshire, situated  south east of Lanark town centre. There is a small wooded island in the loch.

History
The creation of Lanark Loch had been necessary because as the population of Lanark grew its water supplies which had been taken from local wells was inadequate. The site at the Muir at Whitelees, where there had been a spring-fed marsh which had been extended to form a curling pond, was seen as suitable for the creation of a reservoir. The loch, also known as Marr's Loch, increased the drinking water supply for Lanark and its environs until 1881 when it was replaced as the main water supply for the town by Loch Lyoch on Tinto. At this point, Lanark Loch and its surrounding area were returned to public use as an amenity.

Facilities
Facilities on the site include a pitch-and-putt course, children's play facilities and fishing. The Inn on the Loch sits on the north-east bank of the loch and is a long established business, providing limited accommodation as well as a café and restaurant.

Fishing
Lanark Loch is known for its coarse fishing and the loch has been stocked with mirror carp. The population of these fish was all but wiped out in the mid-1980s when the loch was accidentally drained by park staff. The loch was then restocked with carp by the Scottish Carp Group. Other fish present in the loch include tench, roach, perch and pike. A catch and release policy is in operation and permits have to be obtained.

References

External links
 Entry on the Local Authority's website
 The Inn on The Loch's official website

Lochs of South Lanarkshire
Freshwater lochs of Scotland